1983 Uganda Cup was the ninth season of the main Ugandan football Cup.

Overview
The competition has also been known as the Kakungulu Cup and was won by SC Villa who beat Kampala City Council FC 1–0 in the final.  While results are not available for the earlier rounds, KCCA defeated Jinja's Tobacco FC, while SC Villa defeated Express to reach the final.

Final

Footnotes

External links
 Uganda - List of Cup Finals - RSSSF (Mikael Jönsson, Ian King and Hans Schöggl)

Ugandan Cup
Uganda Cup
Cup